Michael David Rapaport (born March 20, 1970) is an American actor and comedian. Beginning his career in the early 1990s, he has made over 100 appearances in film and television. His film roles include True Romance (1993), Higher Learning (1995), Metro (1997), Cop Land (1997), Deep Blue Sea (1999), The 6th Day (2000), Dr. Dolittle 2 (2001), Big Fan (2009), and The Heat (2013). On television, he headlined the Fox sitcom The War at Home (2005–2007) and was a series regular on the Fox drama Boston Public (2001–2004), the fourth season of the Fox serial drama Prison Break (2008–2009), and the Netflix comedy drama Atypical (2017–2021). Rapaport also held recurring roles on the NBC sitcoms Friends (1999) and My Name Is Earl (2007–2008) and the FX Western Justified (2014).

Outside of his acting career, Rapaport directed the 2011 documentary Beats, Rhymes & Life: The Travels of A Tribe Called Quest about the eponymous hip hop group A Tribe Called Quest. Active on several podcasts, he is the host of the I Am Rapaport Stereo Podcast.

Early life and education 
Rapaport was born in New York City, the son of June Brody, a New York radio personality, and David Rapaport, a radio executive who was the general manager of the All-Disco format at New York radio station WKTU Disco 92. He has a brother named Eric Rapaport and an older half-sister named Claudia Lonow (née Rapaport) via his father's prior marriage. After his parents divorced, Rapaport's mother married comic Mark Lonow, who owned The Improv with Budd Friedman.

Rapaport grew up on the Upper East Side of Manhattan, near 70th Street and York Avenue. He is Ashkenazi Jewish; his family is originally from Poland and Russia.

Rapaport had a hard time in school. He attended Erasmus Hall High School in Brooklyn in the 1980s, but was expelled. He graduated from Martin Luther King High School in Manhattan.

Career
In 1989, Rapaport moved to Los Angeles, California when he was 19 years old to try to become a stand-up comic. Rapaport's stepfather, comic Mark Lonow, who owned The Improv with Budd Friedman, helped him get into the stand-up world. He did that for three years.

His big break in acting was on the TV series China Beach.

Rapaport had a recurring role in My Name Is Earl as Frank, a convict Earl reunites with in prison. His character was the reason for many of the things in Earl's life, such as indirectly giving Earl his trailer and El Camino after a botched robbery with his partner, Paco. He played one of the main characters in the season four of Prison Break as Homeland Security Agent Don Self.

In October 2008, Rapaport announced that he was directing a documentary about hip hop act A Tribe Called Quest. The film, Beats, Rhymes & Life: The Travels of a Tribe Called Quest, was released in 2011 and received mostly positive reviews.

Rapaport guest starred in the fifth season of the FX series Justified as villain Daryl Crowe Jr, kingpin of the Crowe family.

On February 12, 2010, Rapaport participated in the NBA All-Star Weekend's Celebrity Game and was named the MVP because of his defense on football player Terrell Owens, the MVP of the last two Celebrity Games, despite scoring just four points and having only a single rebound.

On April 17, 2014, an ESPN 30 for 30 film he directed premiered at the Tribeca Film Festival. The film was about the 1970s championship-winning New York Knicks led by Earl Monroe, Walt Frazier, and Willis Reed.

Rapaport is an occasional guest on the Howard Stern Show on Sirius Satellite Radio, especially when he participates in the staff's fantasy football pool.

Rapaport hosts the I Am Rapaport Stereo Podcast on the CBS Local radio network with childhood friend Gerald Moody.

Other podcasts that Rapaport has appeared on include The Monday Morning Podcast with Bill Burr, Mailtime and Pardon My Take by Barstool Sports, The Adam Carolla Show, The Fighter and The Kid, Unqualified, The Bill Simmons Podcast and its predecessor, The BS Report; The Chive Podcast, WTF with Marc Maron, His & Hers Podcast, Cari Champion's Podcast, The Joey Boots Show, The Dirty Sports Podcast and more.

On June 19, 2017, Rapaport announced on Twitter that he would be joining the popular sports satire website Barstool Sports where he will be a correspondent for the podcast Pardon My Take. On February 18, 2018, Rapaport was fired from Barstool Sports after making a rude comment toward their fan base.

Rapaport is currently also a reporter for Fox Sports, covering the BIG3 basketball league formed by Ice Cube.  He is also the narrator of the WWE 365 series on WWE Network.

Personal life 
In 2000, Rapaport married writer and producer Nichole Beattie. They have two sons. They divorced in 2007.

In 2005, Rapaport wrote an article for Jane magazine about having to evict the actress Natasha Lyonne from a property he was renting to her during a period of heavy drug use on her part. The two have since reconciled and remain friends.

In 2016, Rapaport married his long time girlfriend, actress Kebe Dunn.

In June 2018, Rapaport, while on an American Airlines flight from Houston to Los Angeles, stopped another passenger from opening an emergency door mid-flight.

Harassment charges 
Rapaport was arrested on May 18, 1997, for harassing ex-girlfriend Lili Taylor and charged with two counts of aggravated harassment. He then pleaded guilty to the charges in court and New York Supreme Court Justice Arlene Goldberg issued a protection order to keep the actor from contacting Taylor, as well as mandating that he undergo counseling sessions.

Filmography

Film

Television

Video games

Music videos

Works and publications

References

Further reading

External links

 I Am Rapaport podcast
 
 
 

1970 births
Living people
20th-century American male actors
21st-century American male actors
Male actors from New York City
American people of Polish-Jewish descent
American people of Russian-Jewish descent
Barstool Sports people
People from the Upper East Side
Jewish American male actors
American male comedians
American male film actors
American documentary filmmakers
American stand-up comedians
American male television actors
American male video game actors
American podcasters
Comedians from New York City
20th-century American comedians
21st-century American comedians
American landlords
21st-century American Jews